This is a comprehensive list of awards and nominations received by American saxophonist Kenny G.

American Music Awards
The American Music Awards is an annual awards ceremony created by Dick Clark in 1973.

Billboard Music Awards
The Billboard Music Awards is sponsored by Billboard magazine and is held annually in December.

Grammy Awards
The Grammy Awards are held annually by the National Academy of Recording Arts and Sciences.

Hong Kong Film Awards

Latin Grammy Awards
The Latin Grammy Awards is an award by the Latin Academy of Recording Arts & Sciences to recognize outstanding achievement in the Latin Music industry.

NAACP Image Awards

Soul Train Music Awards
The Soul Train Music Awards is an annual award show which previously aired in national television syndication, and honors the best in Black music and entertainment. It is produced by the makers of Soul Train, the program from which it takes its name.

References

G, Kenny